St. Judes' Shrine is located in Jhansi in the state of Uttar Pradesh, India. The Roman Catholic Latin Rite shrine is devoted to St. Jude Thaddaeus and is part of the Roman Catholic Diocese of Jhansi.

See also

Roman Catholicism in India

External links

References

Catholic pilgrimage sites
Roman Catholic churches in Uttar Pradesh
Buildings and structures in Jhansi